Brezoi is a town located in Vâlcea County, Romania. It administers eight villages: Călinești, Corbu, Drăgănești, Golotreni, Păscoaia, Proieni, Valea lui Stan and Văratica. It is situated in the historical region of Oltenia.

Notable people
Medi Dinu (1909–2016), painter, of Jewish origin, belonging to the interbellum avant-garde current
 Mihai Țurcan (born 1941), footballer

Population

References

Populated places in Vâlcea County
Towns in Romania
Localities in Oltenia